"" ("The Old Woman"), K. 517, is a song for voice and piano by Wolfgang Amadeus Mozart to a poem by Friedrich von Hagedorn.

History
The work was completed in Vienna on 18 May 1787, at the same time as the demanding string quintets K. 515 and K. 516. The song features a dramatic musical portrait of an old woman reminiscing of the Good old days. The Great Comet of 1744 is mentioned in the lyrics. Mozart found the text in the composer Anton Steffan's Sammlung Deutscher Lieder, nr. 24 in part 2, Vienna 1779; Hagedorn's second verse was not present in this version.

Music
The text is set in strophic form to 24 bars. The vocal range reaches from B to E with a tessitura from E to D.

A performance lasts between three-and-a-half and four-and-a-half minutes.

Lyrics

Recordings
1956: Elisabeth Schwarzkopf (soprano), Walter Gieseking (piano), record notes by William S. Mann 1956. EMI ASD 3858 063-01578.

References

External links
, includes discography and audio

, discography

1787 compositions
1787 songs
Compositions by Wolfgang Amadeus Mozart
Compositions in E minor